Ralph Borghard (born 17 April 1944) is a German former figure skater who represented East Germany for most of his career. He is the 1963 Blue Swords champion and a three-time East German national champion (1963, 1964, and 1966). His best result at an ISU Championship, sixth, came at the 1966 European Championships.

Personal life 
Ralph Borghard was born 17 April 1944 in Rostock. He became a dentist in Berlin.

Career 
Ralph Borghard represented East Germany and SC Dynamo Berlin for most of his career, coached by Inge Wischnewski. In 1962, he won the East German national silver medal and was given his first major international assignment, the 1962 European Championships. He finished 15th at the event in Geneva. The following season, he became the national champion and improved to 11th at Europeans.

In the 1963–64 season, Borghard won Blue Swords and his second national title. He qualified to represent the United Team of Germany at the 1964 Winter Olympics in Innsbruck and finished 11th.

In the 1965–66 season, Borghard won his third national title and finished sixth at the 1966 European Championships in Bratislava. His next assignment was the World Championships in Davos, Switzerland in late February 1966. After concluding the competition in 14th place, he decided not to return to East Germany and defected to West Germany.

In April 1966, it was reported that Borghard and a West German single skater, Uschi Keszler, had considered teaming up to compete in pairs. The two practiced some lifts together but her parents rejected the idea. Borghard returned to single skating and won the 1967 West German national silver medal before retiring from competition.

Results

References

German male single skaters
1944 births
Living people
Olympic figure skaters of Germany
Figure skaters at the 1964 Winter Olympics
People from Rostock
East German defectors
Olympic figure skaters of the United Team of Germany